Jimmy Shand (2 August 1893 – 13 January 1977) was  a former Australian rules footballer who played with Richmond in the Victorian Football League (VFL).

Notes

External links 
		

1893 births
1977 deaths
Australian rules footballers from Victoria (Australia)
Richmond Football Club players